Emin Azizov (born December 29, 1984) is a male freestyle wrestler from Azerbaijan. He participated in the Men's freestyle 66 kg at the 2008 Summer Olympics. In the 1/16 of final he beat Swiss Grégory Sarrasin, but lost in the next round against Leonid Spiridonov and was eliminated from the competition.

He won a bronze medal at the 2008 European Wrestling Championships.

External links
 Wrestler bio on beijing2008.com
 

Living people
1984 births
Wrestlers at the 2008 Summer Olympics
Olympic wrestlers of Azerbaijan
Azerbaijani male sport wrestlers
European Wrestling Championships medalists
21st-century Azerbaijani people